The 2006–07 Regionalliga season was the thirteenth season of the Regionalliga at tier three of the German football league system. It was contested in two geographical divisions with eighteen teams in the south and nineteen in the north. The champions, FC St. Pauli and SV Wehen, and the runners-up, VfL Osnabrück and TSG 1899 Hoffenheim, of every division were promoted to the 2. Bundesliga.

North

Results

Top goal scorers

South

Results

Top goal scorer

'II' teams are amateur sides attached to higher league clubs and cannot be promoted above this level, irrespective of their final position. In the event of a 'II' side finishing in the promotion places, the next club below will instead be promoted.

References

External links
 Regionalliga at the German Football Association 
 Regionalliga Nord 2006–07 at kicker.de
 Regionalliga Süd 2006–07 at kicker.de

Regionalliga seasons
3
Germ